Secure Password Authentication (SPA) is a proprietary Microsoft protocol used to authenticate Microsoft email clients with an electronic mail server when using the Simple Mail Transfer Protocol (SMTP), Post Office Protocol (POP), or Internet Message Access Protocol (IMAP).  The protocol was based on the Integrated Windows Authentication (NTLM) authentication scheme.

References

Microsoft Windows security technology
Password authentication
Email authentication